Graellsia may refer to:
Graellsia isabellae, a species of European moth belonging to the monotypic genus Graellsia
Graellsia (plant), a genus of cruciferous plant
Graellsia (journal), a Spanish zoological journal